2022 CONCACAF U-20 Championship qualifying took place between 5–13 November 2021 in Santo Domingo, Dominican Republic. The teams compete for four of the twenty berths in the 2022 CONCACAF U-20 Championship final tournament.

Teams
The 41 CONCACAF teams were ranked based on the CONCACAF Men’s Under-20 Ranking as of June 2019. A total of 34 teams entered the tournament. The highest-ranked 16 entrants were exempt from qualifying and advanced directly to the group stage of the final tournament, while the lowest-ranked 18 entrants participated in qualifying, where the four group winners advanced to the round of 16 of the knockout stage of the final tournament.

Notes

Draw
The draw for the qualifying round took place on 17 September 2021, 11:00 EST (UTC−4), at the CONCACAF Headquarters in Miami. The 19 teams which initially entered the qualifying stage were drawn into four groups: three groups of five teams and one group of four teams. Montserrat, initially drawn into Group C, later withdrew before the start of the tournament.

(W): Withdrew after draw

Qualifying stage
The winners of each group qualified for the 2022 CONCACAF U-20 Championship, where they enter the round of 16 of the knockout stage.

All times are local, AST (UTC-04:00). (5/6 November matches ADT (UTC-03:00).

Tiebreakers
The ranking of teams in each group was determined as follows (Regulations Article 12.3):
Points obtained in all group matches (three points for a win, one for a draw, zero for a loss);
Goal difference in all group matches;
Number of goals scored in all group matches;
Points obtained in the matches played between the teams in question;
Goal difference in the matches played between the teams in question;
Number of goals scored in the matches played between the teams in question;
Fair play points in all group matches (only one deduction could be applied to a player in a single match):
Yellow card: −1 points;
Indirect red card (second yellow card): −3 points;
Direct red card: −4 points;
Yellow card and direct red card: −5 points;
Drawing of lots.

Group A

Group B

Group C

Group D

Goalscorers

Notes

References

Qualifying
U-20 Championship qualifying stage
2022 in youth association football
CONCACAF U-20 Championship qualification
November 2021 sports events in North America